Goebel is a surname. Notable people with the surname include:

 Charles Paul Goebel (born 1956), American architect and land planner
 Brad Goebel (born 1969), professional American football player
 Ed Goebel (1898–1959), Major League Baseball player
 Evandro Goebel (born 1986), Brazilian footballer
 Florian Goebel (1972–2008), German astrophysicist
 Günter Goebel (1917–1993), German officer during World War II
 Joey Goebel (born 1980), American author
 Justus Goebel (1860–1919), American politician
 Karl Ritter von Goebel (1855–1932), German botanist
 Louis S. Goebel (1839–1915), New York politician
 Paul G. Goebel (1901–1988), American football player
 Peter Goebel, president of Elmhurst College
 Reinhard Goebel (born 1952), German conductor and violinist
 Timothy Goebel (born 1980), American figure skater
 Walther F. Goebel (1899—1993), American immunologist
 William Goebel (1856–1900), 34th Governor of Kentucky; assassinated

See also 
 Goebel Brewing Company, a brewing company in Detroit, Michigan from 1873–1964
 Goebel Soccer Complex, a sports facility in Evansville, Indiana
 Göbel (disambiguation)
 Goebbels (disambiguation)

German-language surnames
Surnames from given names